Michael Brooks (born October 2, 1964) is a former American football linebacker in the National Football League (NFL). He played for the Denver Broncos, the New York Giants, and the Detroit Lions. He was an All American college football player at Louisiana State University for the LSU Tigers football team. Brooks is an inductee in the Colorado Sports Hall of Fame and the Louisiana Sports Hall of Fame.

References

1964 births
Living people
Sportspeople from Ruston, Louisiana
American football linebackers
LSU Tigers football players
Denver Broncos players
New York Giants players
Detroit Lions players
American Conference Pro Bowl players